"Replay" is the third single released by Mr. Children on July 1, 1993.

Overview
The single reached #19 on the Oricon Japanese charts selling 88,330 copies during its run on the chart. The title track, "Replay", was used to promote Pocky through commercials and was also included in the group's first compilation album, Mr. Children 1992–1995, which was released on July 11, 2001. The b-side track, "All by myself", was a re-cut from Mr. Children's second album Kind of Love released on December 1, 1992. "Replay" has also been covered by other artists including Sotte Bosse, who covered the song on her album "Moment" released on October 3, 2007.

Track listing

Personnel 
 Kazutoshi Sakurai – vocals, guitar
 Kenichi Tahara – guitar
 Keisuke Nakagawa – bass
 Hideya Suzuki – drums

Production 
 Producer – Kobayashi Takeshi
 Arrangement - Mr. Children and Takeshi Kobayashi
 Recording - Kunihiko Imai
 Mixing - Kunihiko Imai

References 

1993 singles
Mr. Children songs
Songs written by Kazutoshi Sakurai
1993 songs
Toy's Factory singles
Song recordings produced by Takeshi Kobayashi